Stockton is an unincorporated community in Baldwin County, Alabama, United States.  It is the nearest community to Bottle Creek Indian Mounds, a National Historic Landmark.

The community is part of the Daphne-Fairhope-Foley metropolitan area.

A slasher film, Friday the 13th Part VII: The New Blood, was made in and around the Stockton area.

Demographics

The most recent estimates of the population of the community, puts the population somewhere near 2,046 individuals. These estimates also list the following races and ethnicities:

 Caucasian/White - 79.7%
 African-Americans - 18.2%
 Native Americans - 2.1%

History
The community is most likely named for Francis Stockton, who was appointed in 1809 to select a site for the first Baldwin County courthouse. The Stockton post office first began operations in 1837. The U. S. Mail service delivered mail from Montgomery, Alabama by stage coach twice a week to Stockton.  In 1855 the United States government started a mail service between Mobile, Stockton and Claiborne, Alabama.  Steamers were awarded contracts for carrying the mail, each leaving Mobile twice a week, touching at Stockton, which was connected to Montgomery by the stage line.

Transportation 
Stockton is served by several major roadways, in and around the small community. Stockton is also home to a small seaplane base, mainly frequented by general aviation traffic.

Major Roadways 

  Interstate 65
  Alabama State Route 59

Airfields 

 Hubbard Landing Seaplane Base

Gallery

References 

Unincorporated communities in Baldwin County, Alabama
Unincorporated communities in Alabama